Jim Pearson (born 24 March 1953 in Falkirk) is a Scottish former footballer. Pearson played for St Johnstone, Everton and Newcastle United until injury cut short his professional career.

Pearson went on to work for Nike where he played a pivotal role in the evolution of the Nike brand in the UK as Head of Football, a position which he held for 14 years.

Pearson is a Sports Consultant for Blacks Solicitors LLP in Leeds.

References 

1953 births
Living people
Footballers from Falkirk
Association football forwards
Scottish footballers
St Johnstone F.C. players
Everton F.C. players
Newcastle United F.C. players
Barrow A.F.C. players
Gateshead F.C. players
Scottish Football League players
English Football League players
Northern Premier League players
National League (English football) players
Scotland under-23 international footballers
Scottish football managers
Blyth Spartans A.F.C. managers